Natalia Sergeyevna Shestakova (born 18 October 1988) is a Russian former pair skater. With Pavel Lebedev, she is the 2004 World Junior Champion. Earlier, she competed with Maxim Trankov.

Programs 
(with Lebedev)

Competitive highlights
(with Lebedev)

References

External links

Navigation

Russian female pair skaters
Sportspeople from Perm, Russia
Living people
1988 births
World Junior Figure Skating Championships medalists